Sabine Nogbou  (born 8 June 1990) is a French-born Ivorian footballer who plays as a midfielder for the Ivory Coast women's national football team. She was part of the team at the 2014 African Women's Championship. On club level, she played for US Saint-Maur in France.

See also

 2014 African Women's Championship squads
List of Ivory Coast women's international footballers

References

External links
 CAF player profile

1990 births
Living people
Citizens of Ivory Coast through descent
Ivorian women's footballers
Women's association football midfielders
Ivory Coast women's international footballers
Footballers from Paris
French women's footballers
French sportspeople of Ivorian descent
Black French sportspeople